Sir Nicholas Smith (1575–1622), of Exeter, Devon, was an English lawyer, landowner and Gentleman of the Privy Chamber.

He attended Oxford University. He was knighted at James I's coronation in 1603. He was a Member of Parliament for St Mawes in 1614.

References

1575 births
1622 deaths
Politicians from Exeter
Alumni of the University of Oxford
Gentlemen of the Privy Chamber
Members of the Parliament of England for St Mawes
English MPs 1614
Place of birth missing
Nicholas
Knights Bachelor